Gomisin A is a bio-active compound isolated from Schisandra chinensis.

References

Phytochemicals